Slovenia competed at the 2014 Winter Olympics in Sochi, Russia, from 7 to 23 February 2014. Sixty-six competitors were chosen to participate, in eight sports. For the first time since the country's independence, the Slovenia men's national ice hockey team qualified for the Olympic tournament (although previously, Yugoslavia's teams at the Olympics consisted mostly of Slovenian players).

On 12 February, Tina Maze won the women's downhill, becoming the first ever Winter Olympic gold medalist for Slovenia. Maze's skiing time was identical to that of Dominique Gisin of Switzerland, so two gold medals were awarded, this being the first time that an Olympic gold medal in alpine skiing was shared.  Maze went on to win a second gold in giant slalom. Peter Prevc and Žan Košir each won one silver and one bronze medal in ski jumping and snowboarding, respectively. Vesna Fabjan won bronze in the women's cross-country sprint and Teja Gregorin another bronze in the women's biathlon pursuit, bringing the total number of medals to 8.

Eight medals is an all-time Olympic record for Slovenia. In fact, Slovenia won more medals in Sochi than at all previous Winter Olympics combined.

Medalists

Summary
On 21 January 2014, the Olympic Committee of Slovenia officially confirmed 66 competitors who would represent the country at the Sochi Winter Olympics. Following the national ice hockey team securing a place at the Olympic tournament by winning the group at the qualification tournament, Sochi saw the largest Slovenian delegation at Winter Olympics to date. Tomaž Razingar, the captain of the ice hockey team, was chosen as the flag bearer at the opening ceremony. Slovenia sent competitors in 8 sports, apart from ice hockey also in alpine skiing, biathlon, freestyle skiing, snowboarding, Nordic combined, ski jumping, and cross-country skiing.

Pre-games favourites included alpine skier Tina Maze, a double silver medallist from Vancouver, who won the 2013 Alpine Skiing World Cup with a huge margin and victories in all five disciplines in a single season, biathlete Jakov Fak, bronze medallist from Vancouver where he represented Croatia, snowboarder Rok Marguč, the 2013 World Champion in parallel slalom, and the Slovenian ski jumping team, together with Peter Prevc (2nd in the World Cup standings prior to the Olympics) at both individual events. Petra Majdič, who won bronze in Vancouver in cross-country skiing, concluded her competitive career in 2011 and came to Sochi as the leader of Slovenian delegation.

The first days of the Olympics saw several injuries in the Slovenian team. Alpine skier Rok Perko fell at the downhill training and broke his nose, consequently he did not appear in neither the downhill nor the super-G races. Snowboarder Cilka Sadar suffered a knee injury at halfpipe training which also caused her withdrawal from the competition. Matija Mihič, who qualified for snowboard cross, suffered a knee injury before coming to Sochi and did not travel to Russia. Ski jumper Robert Kranjec fell at the qualifications of the normal hill event. He had to skip the normal hill event but managed to compete at the large hill and at the team event.

Alpine skiing turned out to be the most successful sport for Slovenia in Sochi. Following a 4th place in combined, Tina Maze won the gold medal in downhill on 12 February, tying with Dominique Gisin of Switzerland. Maze then finished 5th in super-G and won her second gold medal in giant slalom. In slalom, Maze finished on the 8th place and concluded the Olympics as best individual skier in Sochi. Other Slovenian skiers were moderately successful, with Maruša Ferk and Ilka Štuhec finishing 10th in combined and downhill, respectively. Among the men, the best result was 11th place of Mitja Valenčič in slalom.

In biathlon, Jakov Fak was defending his bronze medal from Vancouver but finished 10th in sprint. Following less successful performances in pursuit and individual events, Fak finished 4th in mass start. Teja Gregorin won a bronze medal in pursuit, improving the 15th place from the sprint event. This was also first medal in biathlon for Slovenia, since Jakov Fak's bronze from Vancouver was won for Croatia. Gregorin then finished 11th in individual event and 5th in mass start. The latter result was later improved to a 4th place, following the disqualification of Evi Sachenbacher-Stehle of Germany. Slovenia did not compete in the mixed relay since Andreja Mali failed to qualify for the Olympics individually. In the men's relay, Slovenia recorded another successful result, finishing 6th.

Cross-country skiing saw only female participants compete for Slovenia. Vesna Fabjan and Katja Višnar made it to semi-finals in sprint. Višnar placed 5th in her group and finished 9th overall while Fabjan finished 2nd in her group and advanced to the finals. There, she won a bronze medal, thus succeeding Majdič on the podium in this discipline. The women's relay team finished in 11th place, and Višnar and Alenka Čebašek finished the team sprint as 10th.

Filip Flisar was the sole representative of Slovenia in freestyle skiing. He won his round of 16 and quarterfinals groups but then fell in the semifinals. In the small final, Flisar finished on the 2nd place, thus finishing 6th overall and improving his achievement from Vancouver, where he was 8th. After the race, the Slovenian and Canadian teams filed a complaint to FIS, pointing out presumed irregularities in the equipment of French competitors. The complaint was rejected as it was filed too late.

At the ice hockey tournament, the Slovenian team was considered an underdog. Slovenia qualified for Olympics for the first time since independence, by beating Belarus, Denmark and Ukraine at the qualification tournament (however, the Yugoslavian teams that competed at the Olympics five times consisted mostly of Slovenian players). Slovenia played in the Group A. In the first game, Slovenia played against the host nation, Russia. After two quick Russian goals at the beginning of the game, Žiga Jeglič scored twice in the second third. Russia won 5–2, but the Slovenian team received a very positive feedback for their Olympic debut. In the following game, Slovenia defeated Slovakia 3–1; goal scorers for Slovenia were Rok Tičar, Tomaž Razingar and Anže Kopitar. In the last group match, Slovenia lost to United States 5–1, Marcel Rodman scored a goal for Slovenia in the last minute of the match. The victory against Slovakia assured Slovenia 3rd place in Group A and 8th place in playoff standings. In the qualification playoffs, Slovenia defeated Austria 4–0. Goal scorers were Kopitar, Jan Urbas, Sabahudin Kovačevič and Jan Muršak. Robert Kristan was commended for his defences as the goalie. In the quarterfinals, Slovenia lost 0–5 to Sweden and finished 7th in the overall standings. Despite this defeat, the 2014 Olympic tournament saw the best performance of the Slovenian team in history. Foreign commentators praised the achievements of the team coming from a country with 150 professional players, seven skating rinks and one NHL star player (Kopitar of Los Angeles Kings).

In Nordic combined, Slovenia's best result was a 16th place of Marjan Jelenko at large hill/10 km event. Since Slovenia qualified only three competitors, they did not participate in the team competition.

Ski jumping was the next sport where the stakes were high for Slovenia. Peter Prevc came to Sochi as 2nd-ranked in the World Cup standings and Slovenia won both team events of the season. Following his fall in the qualifications for the normal hill event, Robert Kranjec missed the competition. Prevc was third after the first round and gained another place in the finals, winning a silver medal and finishing just after Kamil Stoch of Poland. This was the first medal for Slovenia in Sochi and the first individual Olympic medal in ski jumping for independent Slovenia (in Salt Lake City, Slovenia finished 3rd in the team event). In addition to Prevc's medal, Jernej Damjan finished 9th and Jurij Tepeš 26th. At the large hill, Kranjec returned but failed to reach the final round. Prevc was fourth after the first round and again gained one place in the finals, winning his second Olympic medal, a bronze. At the team large hill event, Slovenian team finished on the 5th place after excellent performance by Prevc (who set best results in both series) and somehow weaker jumps by Kranjec, Damjan and Tepeš. In the inaugural women's normal hill event, Maja Vtič finished 6th after a weaker landing in the first series. Katja Požun finished 11th.

In snowboarding, Slovenia was represented by three competitors in freestyle and five in alpine disciplines. Cilka Sadar could not start in slopestyle because of an injury at a training. In halfpipe, the best result was achieved by Tim-Kevin Ravnjak, who finished 8th in the final round. Since the introduction of parallel disciplines to the Olympics, Slovenia always had at least one competitor in quarterfinals but never higher. In parallel giant slalom, Žan Košir, Rok Flander and Rok Marguč secured places in the quarterfinals. Only Košir advanced to the semifinals, where he lost to Nevin Galmarini of Switzerland. In the third place race, Košir defeated Patrick Bussler of Germany, thus winning bronze, the first medal for Slovenian snowboarders. In parallel slalom, Košir made it to the finals, where he won his second Olympic medal, a silver, coming second to Vic Wild of Russia.

Košir's silver medal was the final medal for Slovenia at the Sochi Olympics. Following this win, Košir was chosen as the flag bearer for Slovenia at the closing ceremony.

Alpine skiing 

Slovenia's team consisted of eight athletes. Only seven competed as skier Rok Perko was injured during training and could not compete.

Men

Women

Biathlon 

Based on their performance at the 2012 and 2013 Biathlon World Championships, Slovenia qualified 5 men and 1 woman.

Cross-country skiing 

Distance

Sprint

Freestyle skiing 

Ski cross

Qualification legend: FA – Qualify to medal round; FB – Qualify to consolation round

Ice hockey 

Slovenia qualified a men's team by winning the qualification tournament, this was the first time the nation qualified an ice hockey team to the Olympics.

Men's tournament

Roster

Group stage

Qualification playoffs

Quarterfinals

Nordic combined

Ski jumping 

Slovenia qualified nine quota places in ski jumping.

Men

Women

Snowboarding 

Slovenia qualified a total of nine athletes for the following events. Matija Mihič qualified for snowboard cross but had to stay at home because of knee injury.

Alpine

Freestyle

Qualification Legend: QF – Qualify directly to final; QS – Qualify to semifinal

See also
Slovenia at the 2014 Summer Youth Olympics

References

External links 

Slovenia at the 2014 Winter Olympics

Nations at the 2014 Winter Olympics
2014
Winter Olympics